The ITM Group of Institutions is a group of educational institutions in India, headquartered from Mumbai, Maharashtra, India, which is managed by the ITM Trust. It was founded in 1991 by founder and chairman Dr P. V. Ramana.

Institutions established by the group include two universities, ITM University, Raipur and ITM Vocational University.

ITM business schools 
The ITM business schools offer a 2-year full-time AICTE Post Graduate Diploma in Management program. They include:
 ITM Business School, Bengaluru in Bengaluru, Karnataka, established in 1992
 ITM University, Raipur in Raipur, Chhattisgarh, established in 2012 
 ITM Business School, Chennai, in Chennai, Tamil Nadu, established in 1993
 ITM Business School Navi Mumbai, in Navi Mumbai, established in 1991
 ITM Business School, Warangal, in Warangal, Telangana, established in 1995
 ITM Institute of Financial Markets, established in 2004 in Navi Mumbai

ITM Executive Education Centre 
The ITM Group of Institutions offer a 2-year weekend Executive Management program in multiple Centres across Mumbai, Navi Mumbai, Bangalore, Chennai,etc .

 ITM EEC, Bengaluru, Karnataka
 ITM EEC, Vashi, Kharghar, Dombivli, Thane, Sion, Vile Parle, Kandivali
 ITM EEC, Chennai
 ITM EEC, Pune

Undergraduate schools 
 ITM Institute of Hotel Management (ITM-IHM), founded in 2002
 ITM Institute of Fashion, Design and Technology (ITM IFDT)
 ITM Institute of Health Sciences (ITM-IHS)
 ITM College of Engineering, Nagpur
 Coastal Institute For Technology and Management
 ITM Institute of Design & Media (ITM-IDM), Mumbai

Universities 
The ITM group has established two private universities, ITM University, Raipur establish in 2012 and ITM Vocational University, Vadodara, established in 2014.

References

External links
 

Business schools in Mumbai
1991 establishments in Maharashtra
Educational institutions established in 1991